Metropolitan Business Academy is an interdistrict magnet high school located on 115 Water Street in New Haven, New Haven County, in Connecticut. It is part of the New Haven Public School District. It consists of approximately 400 students. It is located near New Haven's Route 1 Highway and Long Island Sound. The school operates with three trimesters, and alternating block schedule (A day, B day).

Metropolitan offers students four academic paths of study - Allied Health and Science, Digital Arts and Technology, Law and Political Science, and Finance.

References

http://www.nhps.net/MetropolitanBusiness

Public high schools in Connecticut